Etzion (lit. of the tree), also spelled Ezion, can refer to places and topics relating to modern, ancient Israel and the West Bank:

 Ezion-Geber, a biblical Idumaean and Israelite port on the Red Sea
 Kfar Etzion, a kibbutz established in the early 20th century south of Jerusalem
 Gush Etzion, an eponymous bloc surrounding the kibbutz
 Gush Etzion Regional Council, a modern local government in that area
 Kfar Etzion massacre, a Jordanian massacre of kibbutz members
 Nir Etzion, a moshav established by survivors of the massacre
 Har Etzion, a yeshiva founded during the bloc's reestablishment
 Etzion Airbase, a former Israeli AFB in the Sinai Peninsula near the Red Sea (currently Taba International Airport)
 Etzion, the codename for the Israeli Air Force base in Žatec, Czechoslovakia, in the 1948 Arab–Israeli War
 Yehuda Etzion, an Israeli activist and member of the Jewish Underground
 Yeshiva Etzion, a yeshiva located in Queens, NY, established in 2003 by Rabbi Avraham Gaon
 Yeshivat Or Etzion, a Hesder Yeshiva, religious high school, and religious army preparation high school
 Gush Etzion Convoy, one of many convoys sent by the Haganah to the four blockaded kibbutz im of Gush Etzion
 Gush Etzion Junction ("Tzomet HaGush") also known as Gush Junction